Capture of Fez may refer to:

Capture of Fez (1549) by the Saadi Sultanate
Capture of Fez (1554) by the Ottoman Empire
Capture of Fez (1576) during a Saadi civil war